San Severino Lucano is a town and comune in the province of Potenza, in the Southern Italian region of Basilicata.

References